The Sinfonietta Dresden is a chamber orchestra from Dresden founded in 1994.

History 
The sinfonietta Dresden emerged in 1994 from the Young Dresden Chamber Orchestra.

The versatile ensemble performs works of choral symphonic and instrumental music from Baroque music to Neue Musik. A large number of world premieres of works by contemporary composers such as Herman Berlinski, Karsten Gundermann, Uwe Krause and  bear witness to the chamber orchestra's commitment to Neue Musik.

The Sinfonietta has also performed at important festivals. They performed at the Koblenz Mendelssohn Tage, the Dresdner Tage der zeitgenössischen Musik and the Dresden Music Festivals. Productions with ZDF, MDR and the Bayerischer Rundfunk, as well as its own CD recordings, round off the chamber orchestra's work.

Premieres

Orchestral works

 2002: San-Eun Lee – Concerto for piano
 2002: Steven Rosenhaus – Concerto for violin
 2002: Karsten Gundermann – Concerto for three violins
 2004: Johannes Korndörfer – Horch!
 2005: Lothar Voigtländer – Orchestermusik III
 2005: Peter Helmut Lang – in the scream of the sea
 2005: Friedemann Sammler – Intermezzo für Kammerorchester
 2005: Jorge García del Valle Méndez – I dream you dreamed about me
 2006: Thuon Burtevitz – Son tamdadam, Konzertreihe Spannungen
 2006: Uwe Krause – ...Land in Sicht...
 2007: Carsten Hennig – Die Angst des Flusses vor der Mündung
 2007: Karoline Schulz – Im Überschwang des Raumes
 2008: Lydia Weisgerber – Des Kleinen Zähmungskraft
 2008: Bernhard Lang – Felder, Dresdner Fassung
 2008: Silke Fraikin – Grazioso 222 Quod libet für Kammerorchester
 2009: Karsten Gundermann – Quantenzeit
 2009: Andreas Kersting – é nijal tout
 2010: Alexander Morawitz – Arktisches Licht
 2010: Christian FP Kram – Spiegelungen
 2010: Annette Schlünz – Spuren
 2011: Konrad Möhwald – Gestern bis morgen, Vier Tageszeiten für Orchester
 2012: Franziska Henke – Guitar concerto
 2014: Sebastian Elikowski-Winkler – (z wjacorka, z wjacorka) wjelika śma)
 2014: Torsten Reitz – Jede Taube
 2014: Christian Münch – Piano concert, fragment
 2015: Alexander Morawitz – Auf der Schwelle
 2015: Doina Rotaru – Fragile (Concerto for clarinet)
 2015: Violeta Dinescu – Tabu-Suite für Orchester No.2
 2016: Christian Schiel – 1. Sinfonie
 2016: Tobias E. Schick – Schichtungen
 2017: Nikolaus Brass – music by numbers III
 2018: Carsten Hennig – Vorstieg
 2019: Karoline Schulz – Wind
2020/21: Franz Martin Olbrisch – ...suggests that something may be

Choral symphonic works

 1995: Herman Berlinski – Prager Kantate
 1995: Ludger Vollmer – Veni creator spiritus
 1995: Thomas Kupsch – Stabat Mater
 1998: Dietrich Lohff – Requiem für einen polnischen Jungen
 2004: Matthias Drude – Für Deine Ehre habe ich gekämpft, gelitten
 2006: Manfred Weiss – Wo der Herr nicht das Haus baut
 2006: Manfred Weiss – Confessio Saxonica
 2007: Lothar Voigtländer – MenschenZeit
 2008: Friedbert Wissmann – If there be nothing new
 2010: Manfred Weiss – Te Deum
 2011: Karoline Schulz – In einer dunklen Nacht
 2012: Wilfried Krätzschmar – fragmentum
 2013: Alexander Keuk – Ein Tropfen, ein Schluck in der Höhe
 2014: Jörg Herchet – Cantata para la Fiesta de Nuestra Señora de Guadalupe
 2014: Matthias Drude – Poetische Kommentare zu Bachs Weihnachtsoratorium 1–6
 2015: Alexander Keuk – Statements
 2016: Matthias Drude – Zusage
 2016: Franz Kaern-Biederstedt – Rätselhaftes
 2016: Jörg Herchet – Christmas Oratorio (world premiere of the complete work)
 2017: Matthias Drude – Wir können mit dir unser Leben wagen
 2017: Reiner Bredemeyer –Berichte
 2017: Jörg Herchet – Nun freut euch, lieben Christen g'mein Kantate zur Reformation
 2017: Matthias Drude – Poetischer Kommentar zu BWV 80
 2017: Thomas Stöß – Missa Misericórdiae

References

External links 
 
 

Chamber orchestras
1994 establishments in Germany